Highs in the Mid-Sixties, Volume 6 (subtitled Michigan, Part 2) is a compilation album in the Highs in the Mid-Sixties series, featuring recordings that were released in Michigan.  Highs in the Mid-Sixties, Volume 5 and Highs in the Mid-Sixties, Volume 19 are other volumes in the series featuring bands from this state.

Release data
This album was released in 1984 as an LP by AIP Records (as #AIP-10011).

Notes on the tracks
The all-female band The Pleasure Seekers – pictured on the cover – feature Suzi Quatro (along with three of her sisters), who had later fame as both a rock musician and an actress on Happy Days.  Blues Co. on this album is the same band as the Blues Company on Highs in the Mid-Sixties, Volume 5.  Bobby Fuller's version of "Wine Wine Wine" is included on Pebbles, Volume 2. Friday at the Hideout is also the name of a compilation album of Detroit-area garage rock that was released in 2001 on Norton Records, featuring many of these bands and several of the tracks.

Track listing

Side 1

 Yorkshires: "And You're Mine" (Bruce Alpert), 2:21
 The Underdogs: "Friday at the Hideout" (Dave Leone), 2:10
 Jimmy Gilbert: "Believe What I Say" (Jimmy Gilbert), 2:36
 Jimmy Gilbert: "So Together We'll Live" (Jimmy Gilbert)
 The 4 of Us: "Feel a Whole Lot Better" (Gene Clark), 2:11
 The Masters of Stonehouse: "If You Treat Me Bad Again" (E. Drake), 2:33
 Renegades V: "Wine Wine Wine" (Allday/Shine/Schwartz/Debaub/Haufler), 2:27
 The Bossmen: "Fever of Love" (Jimmy Carver), 2:15

Side 2
 Blues Co.: "Love Machine" (Blues Co.), 2:50
 The Blokes: "All American Girl" (Schwab/Hack/Dick Wagner)
 The Underdogs: "Don't Pretend" (D. Whitehouse), 2:38
 The Chosen Few: "It Just Don't Rhyme" (Hamilton/Nephew), 2:30
 The Bed of Roses: "Hate" (The Bed of Roses), 2:20
 The Chocolate Pickles: "Hey You" (J. Boyar), 2:51
 The Pleasure Seekers: "Never Thought You'd Leave Me" (The Pleasure Seekers)
 Blues Co.: "She's Gone" (Tim Ward), 2:50

Pebbles (series) albums
1984 compilation albums
Music of Michigan